The Alameda may refer to:

 The Alameda (Baltimore), street in Baltimore, Maryland
 The Alameda (Los Angeles), below grade freight rail expressway
 The Alameda (San Jose), street in Santa Clara County, California
 Alameda de las Pulgas, sometimes called The Alameda, a street between San Carlos and Menlo Park, California
 The Alameda (Indianapolis, Indiana), apartment building on the National Register of Historic Places

See also
Alameda (disambiguation)